The 1955 Dutch Grand Prix was a Formula One motor race held at Zandvoort on June 19, 1955. It was race 5 of 7 in the 1955 World Championship of Drivers. The 100-lap race was won by Mercedes driver Juan Manuel Fangio after he started from pole position. His teammate Stirling Moss finished second and Maserati driver Luigi Musso came in third.

Race report 

Despite a track made slippery by continuous drizzle, the record crowd was treated to some outstanding  driving as the masters slid their machines through the sand-dunes. Fangio and Moss again took up the lead with Musso's Maserati in pursuit. Kling and Behra were chasing furiously until the German spun into the sand and retired. Mieres then took up the challenge, passing Behra and closing the gap.

However, Musso was too far ahead and was even catching the Mercedes pair who were having to go at full pelt to keep ahead. It was only when he spun off and dropped back that they could relax slightly.

It was another impressive 1-2 for them, despite Moss sustaining a smoking engine late on in the race. Musso had given them a hard challenge and Fangio was the first to congratulate him on his podium finish.

Classification

Qualifying

Race

Notes
 – Includes 1 point for fastest lap

Championship standings after the race 
Drivers' Championship standings

Note: Only the top five positions are included.

References

Dutch Grand Prix
Dutch Grand Prix
Grand Prix
Dutch Grand Prix